Scopula misera is a moth of the  family Geometridae. It is found on the Tenimbar Islands and Flores.

Subspecies
Scopula misera misera (Flores)
Scopula misera subtincta (Warren, 1896) (Tenimbar Islands)

References

Moths described in 1866
misera
Moths of Indonesia